The Pinyon Conglomerate is a geological formation in Wyoming whose strata date back to the Late Cretaceous. Dinosaur remains are among the fossils that have been recovered from the formation.

Vertebrate paleofauna 
 Leptoceratops sp.

See also 

 List of dinosaur-bearing rock formations

References 

Geologic formations of Wyoming
Upper Cretaceous Series of North America
Maastrichtian Stage
Conglomerate formations
Fossiliferous stratigraphic units of North America
Paleontology in Wyoming